Ismaila Wafougossani Soro (born 7 May 1998) is an Ivorian professional footballer who plays as a midfielder for Portuguese club Arouca on loan from Celtic.

Club career

Celtic
On 27 January 2020, Soro signed a four-and-a-half-year deal with Celtic. He joined the Scottish champions after representing Bnei Yehuda in the Israeli Premier League since 2018. He scored his first goal for Celtic in a 3–0 win over Dundee United on 30 December 2020.

International career
He made his debut for Ivory Coast national football team on 11 June 2021 in a friendly against Ghana.

Career statistics

Honours
Bnei Yehuda
Israel State Cup: 2018–19

Celtic
Scottish Premiership: 2021–22
Scottish Cup: 2019–20

References

External links
 
 

1998 births
Living people
Ivorian footballers
Association football midfielders
Ivorian expatriate footballers
Expatriate footballers in Moldova
Ivorian expatriate sportspeople in Moldova
Expatriate footballers in Belarus
Ivorian expatriate sportspeople in Belarus
Expatriate footballers in Israel
Ivorian expatriate sportspeople in Israel
Expatriate footballers in Scotland
Ivorian expatriate sportspeople in Scotland
Expatriate footballers in Portugal
Ivorian expatriate sportspeople in Portugal
FC Saxan players
FC Gomel players
Bnei Yehuda Tel Aviv F.C. players
Celtic F.C. players
F.C. Arouca players
Moldovan Super Liga players
Belarusian Premier League players
Israeli Premier League players
Scottish Professional Football League players
Ivory Coast international footballers